Ananda Chandra College, also known as AC College was established in the year 1942, is one of the oldest colleges in Jalpaiguri located in the Indian state of West Bengal. It offers undergraduate courses in arts and sciences and also offers PG courses in Bengali. The campus is situated in the Jalpaiguri district and is affiliated with University of North Bengal.

Departments

The college has the following departments in the field of Science and Arts:

Science 
Department of Physics
Department of Chemistry 
Department of Mathematics
Department of Computer Science
Department of Botany
Department of Zoology
Department of Microbiology
Department of Physiology
Department of Statistics
Department of Economics (B.Sc.)

Arts 

Department of Geography
Department of English
Department of Economics (B.A.)
Department of Bengali
Department of Sanskrit
Department of Political Science
Department of Philosophy
Department of Sociology
Department of History
Department of Education
Department of Hindi
Department of Nepali
Department of Physical Education
Department of Environmental Studies
Department of Mass Communication

Intake Capacity

Accreditation
This College was accredited by the National Assessment and Accreditation Council (NAAC), and awarded B++ grade.
The college is recognized by the University Grants Commission (UGC).

Library 
The college has a library with a collection of text and reference books and journals. Currently, the library contains 45650 books in regular and out-of-print volumes.

Hostel 
The college also contains three separate hostels for boys and girls.

Alumni

Sudip Chakraborty, Indian  economist and poverty and development researcher. Currently he serves as Associate Professor at Department of Economics, Ananda Chandra College

See also

References

External links
Ananda Chandra College
University of North Bengal
University Grants Commission
National Assessment and Accreditation Council

Universities and colleges in Jalpaiguri district
Colleges affiliated to University of North Bengal
Educational institutions established in 1942
1942 establishments in India